This is a list of Honorary Fellows of St Edmund Hall, Oxford.

 Nicolas Browne-Wilkinson, Baron Browne-Wilkinson
 Sir Stanley Burnton
 Sir David Cooksey
 John Cox
 Kevin Crossley-Holland
 Patrick Garland
 Andrew Graham
 Roy Harris
 Terry Jones
 Gabriel Josipovici
 Ken Macdonald, Baron Macdonald of River Glaven
 Tony Marchington
 Bill Miller
 Michael Mingos
 Sir Derek Morris
 Michael Nazir-Ali
 Ronald Oxburgh, Baron Oxburgh
 Gareth Roberts
 Sir Michael Rose
 Richard Smethurst
 Keir Starmer
 Douglas Veale
 Denis Wright

See also 

 :Category:Fellows of St Edmund Hall, Oxford
 :Category:Alumni of St Edmund Hall, Oxford

 
St Edmund Hall